Mmmmm is a Malayalam film directed by Vijeesh Mani and produced by Sohan Roy.  The film revolves around honey hunters from the Kurumba tribe. With a decline in honey bee population, there are fewer Beehives and the film shows how this impacts their livelihood. The title denotes the sound of buzzing honey bees.

The film won the Best film award at 2021 Paris Film Festival.

Cast 
 Semmalar Annam
 I M Vijayan

Songs 
The song Paathyile Nerunki Mollu was sung by Nanjiyamma and recorded at Sreeragam studio on August 30

References 

2021 films
2021 drama films
Indian drama films
2020s Malayalam-language films